Attal surname originated from the Arab word "attâl" (porter). It can be associated with the Spanish town of Atal from the province of La Coruña and is documented since the 17th century as a surname used by Jews.

Notable people with the name include:

People
 Fahed Attal (born 1985), Palestinian professional football player
 Gabriel Attal (born 1989), member of the French National Assembly and government minister
 Henri Attal (1936 – 2003), French actor
 Madeleine Attal (1921–2023), French actress and theatre director
 Yvan Attal (born 1965), Israeli-born French actor and director

See also
 Atal (disambiguation)
 Attali, a surname

References 

Arab-Jewish surnames
Maghrebi Jewish surnames